Tullycarnet is an area of east Belfast, Northern Ireland.

Location
It borders Dundonald to the west, and the main thoroughfare is Kings Road.

Name
The name "Tullycarnet" is from the Irish Tulaigh Charnáin ("hillock of the little cairn"). It is not known where the original cairn was.

Facilities
Facilities include the Comber Greenway (a long cycle/recreational path through east Belfast), Tullycarnet Park, Tullycarnet Community Centre (hosting a variety of leisure activities) and a public library.

References

Districts of Belfast